Ada Ferrer is a Cuban-American historian. She is Julius Silver Professor of History and Latin American Studies at New York University. She was awarded the 2022 Pulitzer Prize in History for her book Cuba: An American History.

Early life 
She was born in Havana, Cuba, migrated to the United States in 1963, and grew up in West New York, New Jersey. Ferrer holds an AB degree in English from Vassar College, 1984, an MA degree in History from University of Texas at Austin, 1988, and a PhD in History from the University of Michigan, 1995.

Career 
She is currently a Julius Silver Professor of History and Latin American Studies at New York University.

She won the 2015 Frederick Douglass Prize for her book Freedom's Mirror: Cuba and Haiti in the Age of Revolution. The book also won the Friedrich Katz, Wesley Logan, and James A. Rawley prizes from the American Historical Association and the Haiti Illumination Prize from the Haitian Studies Association. Ferrer received the Berkshire Conference of Women Historians Book Prize for her book Insurgent Cuba: Race, Nation and Revolution 1868–1898, which was shortlisted for the 2022 Cundill Prize.

She is a 2018 Guggenheim Fellow.

Bibliography 

 Insurgent Cuba: Race, Nation, and Revolution, 1868–1898 . University of North Carolina Press, 1998
 Freedom's Mirror: Cuba and Haiti in the Age of Revolution. Cambridge University Press, 2014
 Cuba: An American History. Scribner, 2021

References

External links
 

1962 births
Living people
21st-century American historians
Horace H. Rackham School of Graduate Studies alumni
Vassar College alumni
University of Texas at Austin College of Liberal Arts alumni
New York University faculty
People from West New York, New Jersey
Historians from New Jersey